On 1 January 2006 there were 885 urban-type settlements (translit.: selysche mis'koho typu) in Ukraine. Below is the list of all urban-type settlements by subdivisions and population, which is given according to the 2001 Ukrainian Census.



Urban-type settlements in Ukraine (by subdivisions)

Autonomous Republic of Crimea | 
Cherkasy Oblast | 
Chernihiv Oblast | 
Chernivtsi Oblast | 
Dnipropetrovsk Oblast | 
Donetsk Oblast | 
Ivano-Frankivsk Oblast | 
Kharkiv Oblast | 
Kherson Oblast | 
Khmelnytskyi Oblast | 
Kyiv Oblast | 
Kirovohrad Oblast | 
Luhansk Oblast | 
Lviv Oblast | 
Mykolaiv Oblast | 
Odesa Oblast | 
Poltava Oblast | 
Rivne Oblast | 
Sevastopol | 
Sumy Oblast | 
Ternopil Oblast | 
Vinnytsia Oblast | 
Volyn Oblast | 
Zakarpattia Oblast | 
Zaporizhzhia Oblast | 
Zhytomyr Oblast

See also

 List of places named after people#Ukraine
 Administrative divisions of Ukraine
 Raions of Ukraine
 List of cities in Ukraine
 List of hromadas of Ukraine

External links
 2001 Ukrainian census, Population structure  
 Regions of Ukraine and its composition 

 
Urban-type settlements